In the Name of Father and Son is a 1999 film directed by Božidar Nikolić.

Plot
The film is a story of a typical Montenegrin family whose son is no longer the same after returning from war.

In a small provincial town, in the days when the Yugoslav wars began, a young journalist from a local television station writes a fiery article that inflames the already boiling passions among the locals. While the men enthusiastically respond to the mobilization and enroll in the volunteer lists en masse, only the journalist's father, an ordinary man from the people, intends to break the family tradition of glorious warriors and prevent his only son from going to the front. When his anti-war operation succeeds, the dilemma remains whether it's cost may have been too high.

Cast 
 Danilo Stojković as Mrgud Miletić
 Branimir Popović as Mirko Miletić
 Sonja Jauković as Marica Miletić
 Petar Božović as Živko Lakić
 Milutin Karadžić as Vukota
 Varja Đukić as Journalist
 Boro Stjepanović as Brica
 Ivana Tomičić as Mikača
 Milo Miranović as Spasoje
 Brano Vuković as Savo
 Slobodan Marunović as Professor
 Neda Arnerić as Ceca
 Branimir Brstina as Slavko

References

External links
 

1999 films
1990s war drama films
Anti-war films
Yugoslav Wars films
Works about the Croatian War of Independence
Serbian war drama films
Yugoslav war drama films
1999 drama films
Films shot in Montenegro
1990s Serbian-language films